Ārvaldis Andrejs Brumanis (13 February 1926 − 17 December 2013) was a Latvian Roman Catholic bishop.

Ordained to the priesthood on 25 July 1954, Brumanis was named bishop of the Roman Catholic Diocese of Liepāja, Latvia on 7 December 1995 and retired on 12 May 2001.

References

1926 births
2013 deaths
People from Aizpute
Latvian Roman Catholic bishops